Hajnówka (Hajnaŭka; , Hainivka; , Hachnovka) is a town and a powiat seat in eastern Poland (Podlaskie Voivodeship) with 21,442 inhabitants (2014). It is the capital of Hajnówka County. The town is also notable for its proximity to the Białowieża Forest, the biggest primaeval forest in Europe. Through Hajnówka flows the river Leśna Prawa. It is one of the centres of Orthodox faith and a notable centre of Belarusian culture in Poland.
Belarusians comprised 26.4% of the town's population in 2002.

It is one of five Polish/Belarusian bilingual Gmina in Podlaskie Voivodeship regulated by the Act of 6 January 2005 on National and Ethnic Minorities and on the Regional Languages, which permits certain gminas with significant linguistic minorities to introduce a second, auxiliary language to be used in official contexts alongside Polish.

History
For a more detailed history of Białowieża and the area see: Białowieża Forest

As a village, it was founded some time in the 16th century as a single house of a forest ward, by a certain Hajno, who was one of the royal officers protecting the Białowieża Forest. In 1589 whole forest became a private property of the royal court and the number of forest workers settled in the area started to grow. However, the forest protection (it was most probably the first forest reserve in the world) prevented the area from economical growth and so the village was limited to a number of wooden huts at the western end of the forest. It mostly shared the history of other similar settlements in the area, including Białowieża itself.

After the Partitions of Poland of late 18th century the area was annexed by Kingdom of Prussia and Russian Empire in 1795 (the border of the partitioning powers, Prussian and Russian, ran on the territory of today's town). In 1807, the Duchy of Warsaw was created, but the territory of Hajnówka (Białystok region) was handed over in full to Russia. After the fall of the Duchy of Warsaw in 1815, Hajnówka remained in the hands of tsarist Russia. The tsarist authorities abolished the forest protection, but the development of the area did not start. As most of the foresters, who worked in the forest, took part in the November Uprising of 1831 against Russia (500 out of 502 in total), their positions were abolished and the people were exiled to Siberia. The protection of the forest was affected. The village, as a matter of fact, ceased its existence. Protection was reintroduced in 1860 and the village was repopulated with Russian officials. In 1888 it became property of the tsarist family.

Between 1894 and 1906 the village was connected with the world by a railroad linking Bielsk Podlaski and Siedlce with Wołkowysk. Hajnówka became a minor transport junction and in 1900 a road was built between Białowieża and Bielsk Podlaski. During World War I, in 1915, the area was captured by the German Empire. Protection of the forest was ceased. The new authorities started large-scale industrial exploitation of the area's nature resources.

In 1919, during the early stages of the Polish-Bolshevik War, the area was handed over to Poland by the local Ober-Ost commander. The predatory exploitation of the forest was put to an end and all German-built factories in the area became nationalised. After the war, some of them were rented by the Polish government under a contract to the British company The Century European Timber Corporation. However, in the late 1920s the contract was canceled and the wood processing plants came back under state control, while the Terbenthen factory was sold to a private owner. Since then, the economic growth started and the village started to grow too. Hard work, but also decent salaries in wood processing plants attracted many settlers from various parts of Poland. The initial conglomerate of wooden huts, barracks, tents and narrow, wood-paved streets turned into a town.

A Catholic church was built for the local population and soon the factories and the state financed three schools, a boarding school of timber industry, a post office, two cinemas and a bank appeared here. Jewish inhabitants built a synagogue and in 1925 the Orthodox Christians organised a chapel in a private flat. Out of approximately 4,000 inhabitants approximately 70% were Poles who had come from all parts of the country, while the rest made up Jews, Germans and Belarusians. Also, the soldiers of the Belarusian division of general Stanisław Bułak-Bałachowicz were interned there after the war and finally were allowed to settle in the area, which added Belarusians and Russians to the ethnic mixture.

By the end of the 1930s the four factories of Hajnówka had 1947 workers altogether and were significantly expanded. The state financed construction of several hundred small houses for the workers and the town grew up rapidly. Also, the town attracted many notable Polish architects of the epoch to build new buildings in modernist style. However, the progress was stopped by the Polish Defensive War of 1939 and the outbreak of World War II. In the effect of the Nazi-Soviet Alliance, the town was annexed by the Soviet Union. The factories were dismantled and sent to Russia while a large part of the inhabitants were in 1940 arrested by the NKVD and imprisoned in the Soviet Gulag system. On 25 June 1941 the town got under German occupation, which ended on 18 July 1944. During the fights the town was severely bombed, which added to the destruction of the city. All in all, until July 18, 1944, more than 700 inhabitants of Hajnówka lost their lives, the factories were robbed and then demolished, while the train station and parts of the town centre were levelled by aerial bombardment.

Despite harsh conditions and infrastructural losses, life returned to Hajnówka quite soon. This attracted new settlers as well as pre-war inhabitants of the area, so the town quickly recovered. Also, the narrow streets were mostly rebuilt. In 1951, the town (until then formally a village) was granted with city rights and between 1954 and 1975 it even served as a seat of a powiat. Hajnówka has 8 schools as well as 5 churches (Catholic and Eastern Orthodox), 2 hospitals, a sewer system, a swimming pool and a museum. Train and bus links were established. In 2005, the local timber factory expanded its production area to 17,500 sq.m, one of the largest in Europe. It is quite modern and used for manufacturing of furniture, mainly to be exported to Western Europe.

Demographics

External links 
Picture satellite cities
 Satellite map of Białowieża Forest
 Tourist attractions in Hajnówka and its vicinity

References 

Cities and towns in Podlaskie Voivodeship
Hajnówka County
Belsky Uyezd (Grodno Governorate)
Białystok Voivodeship (1919–1939)
Belastok Region
Bilingual communes in Poland